Christian diet programs are books and other name-brand products promoting weight-loss diets and other diets that the authors believe are consistent with Christian rules and values.  They may borrow elements from Jewish dietary laws, the Bible, modern nutrition science, or other sources.  Christian diet and exercise programs became popular in the 1970s.  They differ from historical, non-commercial Christian dietary traditions, such as not eating meat on Fridays.

Annual revenues in excess of US$1 billion have been estimated for the US market.  Christian diet books have been bestsellers in the US religion market.  Some have complex marketing programs, with spinoffs, in-person meetings, commercially produced dietary supplements, and other ways to generate revenue.

Characteristics 
Most Christian diet programs are calorie-reduction and exercise programs that have a veneer of Christian behavior over the surface.   Exercise classes feature contemporary Christian music instead of secular music.  Group meetings begin and end in prayer, and books include Bible verses.  Within that context, they can be further subdivided into two categories:

 programs following some form of typical diet and exercise advice, with the addition of spiritual advice, such as to pray when tempted to eat too much food or to skip exercise, and
 programs advocating for an idyllic ancient diet, reminiscent of the Garden of Eden.
Christian diet programs allow adherents to engage in a secular activity (weight loss) with a secular goal (becoming thin or attractive) while maintaining a distinctive religious cultural identity.  This happens through a process of cooptation or cultural appropriation of exercise and dieting from the secular culture.  In style and substance, Christian diet programs influence and are influenced by the evangelical Christian community, secular views on weight loss, the medical and scientific community's approaches to health and fitness, and non-Christian fitness and dieting programs, including yoga.  For example, some Christian diet programs promote their medical and scientific content, and some secular diet programs have begun promoting weight loss as a spiritual act.

Blaming individuals 
Early Christian diet programs emphasized the overweight person's sin and guilt.  Over time, Christian programs changed their message away from guilt and fat shaming towards treating overeating as a type of addiction or psychological problem.  This shift mirrored the changes in secular diet and fitness books at the same time.

Also like non-religious diet programs, the Christian diet authors associate being overweight with individual character flaws and a lack of self-control, rather than systemic factors associated with poor diet, over-consumption of food, and a sedentary lifestyle.  (Examples of systemic factors related to obesity include government policy decisions that make driving more common than biking or walking, or that subsidize the production of refined sugar and grains instead of fresh fruits and vegetables.)

Secular weight-loss programs often ascribe overeating to the person feeling empty in some way, such as having an unfulfilling social or emotional life.  The main difference between these programs and Christian weight-loss programs is that the person's emptiness is believed to be spiritual in nature.

Theology 
Christian diet programs tend to be associated with evangelicalism in the United States but with no particular Christian denomination.

Many Christian diet programs are associated with the health and wealth gospel idea, and treat health as a primary end goal, rather than as means for living out Christian values.  In this mindset, being healthy and thin, rather than Christian values such as love, becomes a "new measuring tape for godliness and spirituality".  Some Christian diet programs are "alarmingly close to depicting a God who loves a size six woman more than a size 16".

Most mainstream diet programs support hegemonic standards for external beauty.  This is the idea that there is one best type of physical appearance, which is thin for women and muscular for men.  Christian diet programs disclaim this, encourage the development of inner beauty, and warn their adherents against vanity and pursuing external beauty.  They emphasize that adherents should undertake their diet and exercise programs with the correct motivations, which are for physical, emotional, and spiritual health.

Christian diet programs promote the idea that the human body is a temple that must be kept holy.  They have been criticized for then equating having a thin, physically beautiful body with being holy and righteous.  A commonly cited Bible verse is 1 Corinthians 6:19–20, which Christian diet programs say means that it is sinful to be overweight.  Critics interpret this differently, such as by saying that people should try to be healthy, or that people should honor God regardless of their appearance.

Programs

See also 

 List of diets
 Disability and religion#Christianity

References 

Weight loss
Diets
Evangelicalism in the United States